Lucy Haeran Koh (born August 7, 1968) is an American lawyer and jurist serving as a U.S. circuit judge of the U.S. Court of Appeals for the Ninth Circuit. She is the first Korean American woman to serve on a federal appellate court in the United States. Koh previously served as a U.S. district judge of the U.S. District Court for the Northern District of California from 2010 to 2021. She also served as a California state court judge of the Santa Clara County Superior Court from 2008 to 2010.

Early life and education 
Born on August 7, 1968, in Washington, D.C., Koh was the first member of her family to be born in the United States. Her mother, a refugee from North Korea, had escaped the country at the age of ten after walking two weeks to South Korea. Her father was a veteran of the Korean War, where he fought Communist forces.

Koh spent most of her childhood in Mississippi, where her mother was an academic at Alcorn State University. She also spent parts of her young life in Maryland and Oklahoma. In 1986, Koh graduated from Norman High School in 1986 in Norman, Oklahoma. She attended Harvard College, where she was awarded a Harry S. Truman Scholarship and graduated in 1990 with a Bachelor of Arts magna cum laude in social studies. She then attended Harvard Law School, where she was a semi-finalist in the Ames Moot Court Competition and graduated in 1993 with a Juris Doctor.

Legal career
From 1993 to 1994, Koh worked for the United States Senate Committee on the Judiciary as a Women's Law and Public Policy Fellow. From 1994 to 1997, Koh worked for the United States Department of Justice, first as a Special Counsel in the Office of Legislative Affairs (19941996) and then as a Special Assistant to the Deputy Attorney General (1996–1997).

From 1997 to 2000, Koh served as an Assistant U.S. Attorney in the U.S. Attorney's Office for the Central District of California. From 2000 to 2002, she worked as a senior associate at Wilson Sonsini Goodrich & Rosati, a Palo Alto, California law firm. From 2002 to 2008, Koh worked as a litigation partner at the Silicon Valley office of the law firm McDermott Will & Emery representing technology companies in patent, trade secret and commercial civil matters.

Service on California state court
In January 2008, California Governor Arnold Schwarzenegger appointed Koh a judge on the Santa Clara County Superior Court, a position she held until 2010 when she became a U.S. District Judge.

Federal judicial service

District court service 
On January 20, 2010, President Barack Obama nominated Koh on the recommendation of California Senators Barbara Boxer and Dianne Feinstein to a seat on the United States District Court for the Northern District of California vacated by judge Ronald M. Whyte, who assumed senior status in 2009. On March 4, 2010, the Senate Judiciary Committee voted to move her nomination to the full Senate. The Senate confirmed Koh by a 90–0 vote on June 7, 2010. She received her commission on June 9, 2010. Her service as the district court judge was terminated on December 15, 2021 when she was elevated to the United States Court of Appeals for the Ninth Circuit.

As a distinct judge, Koh presided over litigation including Apple Inc. v. Samsung Electronics Co., In re High-Tech Employee Antitrust Litigation, FTC v. Qualcomm (finding antitrust liability for conduct in licensing standard-essential patents, later reversed), and multi-district litigation, including the Yahoo and Anthem data breaches and Apple and Google privacy litigation.

In 2020, Koh presided over a case in which a coalition of local governments, activist groups, and American Indian tribes sued the Commerce Department over the Trump administration's intention to end the 2020 Census early. She issued a ruling that ultimately resulted in extending the once-a-decade count from September 30 to October 15.

Koh presided over Tandon v. Newsom, a challenge brought by plaintiffs' challenging California restrictions on gatherings during the COVID-19 pandemic.Ninth Circuit Denies Emergency Relief Permitting In-Home Bible Studies, Metropolitan News-Enterprise (April 1, 2021). Koh denied a plaintiffs' request for an injunction seeking to block the restrictions "insofar as they (1) ban indoor religious gatherings at their homes, including Bible studies, theological discussions, collective prayer, and musical prayer; and (2) limit outdoor religious gatherings at their homes to three households"; Koh ruled in February 2021 that the restrictions did not violate the Free Exercise Clause because "the State's private gatherings restrictions treat religious and secular gatherings alike and make no reference to religion." The Ninth Circuit affirmed Koh's decision, but the Ninth Circuit's ruling was overturned by the U.S. Supreme Court, which issued an order, on a 5–4 vote, determining that the restriction on religious gatherings in private homes was unconstitutional.

Expired nomination to court of appeals under Obama 
On February 25, 2016, President Obama nominated Koh to serve as a United States Circuit Judge of the United States Court of Appeals for the Ninth Circuit, to the seat vacated by Judge Harry Pregerson, who assumed senior status on December 11, 2015. On July 13, 2016, a hearing on her nomination was held before the Senate Judiciary Committee. On September 15, 2016, her nomination was reported out of committee by a 13–7 vote, but the Senate did not act upon her nomination, and it expired on January 3, 2017, at the end of the 114th Congress. President Donald Trump nominated Daniel P. Collins to that seat on February 6, 2019 and was confirmed on May 21, 2019.

Renomination to court of appeals under Biden 

On September 8, 2021, President Joe Biden announced his intention to renominate Koh to be a judge of the U.S. Court of Appeals for the Ninth Circuit. On September 20, 2021, her nomination was sent to the Senate. President Biden nominated Koh to the seat to be vacated by Judge Richard Paez, who had announced his intent to assume senior status upon confirmation of a successor. Koh was unanimously rated "well qualified" for the circuit judgeship by the American Bar Association's Standing Committee on the Federal Judiciary.

On October 6, 2021, the Senate Judiciary Committee held a confirmation hearing on her nomination. During her hearing, Republican senators criticized Koh for her ruling in the Tandon case.Jacqueline Thomsen, Biden 9th Circuit Pick Draws Republican Ire Over COVID-19 Religious Gathering Ruling,National Law Journal (October 6, 2021). At least one Republican senator accused her of being hostile to people of faith; Koh noted that she is herself a person of faith. Another Republican senator, Tom Cotton, suggested that Koh should have disregarded circuit precedent in the Tandon case; Koh responded by noting that she was bound to follow the precedents of higher courts. Democrats defended Koh, and her nomination was also supported by former California Governor Arnold Schwarzenegger, a Republican who appointed Koh to the state court earlier in her career. California Senator Alex Padilla criticized Republicans over attacks on Koh and other Biden judicial nominees, suggesting that Republicans had singled out nonwhite judicial nominees for disparaging treatment.Tal Kopan, [Padilla calls out treatment of judicial nominees of color ahead of Supreme Court fight], San Francisco Chronicle (February 11, 2022). On October 28, 2021, Koh's nomination was reported out of committee by a 13–9 vote.

On December 9, 2021, the Senate invoked cloture on her nomination by a 51–38 vote. On December 13, 2021, Koh was confirmed by a 50–45 vote. Koh is the first Korean-American woman to serve as a federal appellate judge and the second Asian Pacific American woman to serve on the Ninth Circuit from California, after Jacqueline Nguyen. She received her judicial commission on December 14, 2021.

Personal life
Koh is married to Mariano-Florentino Cuéllar, the president of the Carnegie Endowment for International Peace and a former justice of the California Supreme Court and professor at Stanford Law School. They have two children.

See also
 List of Asian American jurists
 List of first women lawyers and judges in California
 List of first women lawyers and judges in the United States
 Hillary Clinton Supreme Court candidates
 Joe Biden judicial appointment controversies
 Joe Biden Supreme Court candidates

References

External links

|-

1968 births
Living people
21st-century American judges
21st-century American women judges
American jurists of Korean descent
Assistant United States Attorneys
California state court judges
Harvard College alumni
Harvard Law School alumni
Judges of the United States Court of Appeals for the Ninth Circuit
Judges of the United States District Court for the Northern District of California
Lawyers from Washington, D.C.
United States court of appeals judges appointed by Joe Biden
United States district court judges appointed by Barack Obama
American people of North Korean descent